Alejandro Toledo is a composer, saxophonist, and ethnomusicologist. Born in Argentina, he is now based in the United Kingdom. He has received various awards including the Evo Music Rooms award for one of the best upcoming artists in the UK. He has also been featured on various TV shows including The Rob Brydon Show.

Career
Toledo is a classically-trained saxophonist. In 2010, he was selected by Channel 4's Evo Music Rooms as one of the UK's best unsigned artists, and he went on to perform with Faithless and Audio Bullys on a televised programme hosted by Edith Bowman. In 2011, he appeared on the Rob Brydon's BBC2 Christmas special alongside Noel Fielding, Sarah Harding, Rhys Darby, and Angelos Epithemiou. In 2013 he was awarded a PhD degree in music performance from Goldsmiths, University of London for his thesis entitled "World Music, Creative Reinterpretation, and the East Moldavian Roma Tradition"

Discography

Studio albums

Television

See also
 Evo Music Rooms
 The Rob Brydon Show
 List of saxophonists
 List of Argentine musicians

References

External links
 Official website

Argentine saxophonists
Male saxophonists
Living people
Alumni of the University of London
Free improvisation saxophonists
21st-century classical composers
Avant-garde musicians
Postmodern composers
21st-century saxophonists
21st-century male musicians
Year of birth missing (living people)